The Saint Margaret of Scotland Anglican Episcopal Church is an Anglican congregation in Budapest, Hungary. The church belongs to the Church of England, part of the Diocese in Europe. 

The church is dedicated to Saint Margaret of Scotland, an Anglo-Saxon princess who was born in exile in the Kingdom of Hungary in the 11th century and is the most famous Hungarian saint in the United Kingdom. Margaret was the daughter of the English prince Edward the Exile, and granddaughter of Edmund Ironside, King of England.

History 
The Anglican Communion has existed for more than two centuries in Hungary. According to current records, there was an Anglican worship service on the first Sunday after the revolution in 1956, and there have been Anglican missionaries in Hungary since the 1890s. In the Tata Castle in Komárom-Esztergom county, there is an Anglican chapel which was previously used officially.

Worship 
A worship service takes place Sunday at 10:30 by Rite II of Church of England at Szentkirály utca 51, Budapest 1088.
Holy Eucharist is celebrated most Sundays at Balaton in the village of Zalaszántó near the town of Keszthely and the spa centre at Hévíz.

References

Sources 
Anglicans in Hungary, published by The Rev. Dr. Frank Hegedűs

External links 
 Official website

Margaret
Churches in Budapest